Kachek Bel-e Sofla (also Romanized as Kachek Bel-e Soflá; also known as Kajak Bel-e Soflá and Kūchek Bel-e Soflá) is a village in Gurani Rural District, Gahvareh District, Dalahu County, Kermanshah Province, Iran. At the 2006 census, its population was 116, in 22 families.

References 

Populated places in Dalahu County